Stu Starner (born April 8, 1943) is an American former college basketball coach. He was an NCAA Division I head men's coach for eleven seasons for Montana State University and the University of Texas at San Antonio (UTSA).

Starner, a native of Hoffman, Minnesota, played basketball and football at the University of Minnesota Morris, graduating in 1965. After a successful high school coaching career in Wabasso and Richfield, Minnesota, Starner moved to the college ranks in 1978 as a graduate assistant at Minnesota. After assistant roles at Montana State and a second stint at Minnesota, Starner was hired as the head coach for Montana State in Bozeman, Montana in 1983. In 1986, Starner's Bobcats won the 1986 Big Sky Conference tournament as the 6 seed, gaining the conference's automatic bid to the NCAA tournament as the only team in the field with a losing overall record. The following season, the Bobcats won the Big Sky Conference regular season title behind Conference Player of the Year Tom Domako.

In 1990, Starner took the unusual step of requesting a one-year sabbatical from his head coaching position at Montana State. His request was granted and assistant Mick Durham was named interim head coach. However, Starner surprised the school two months later by accepting the head coaching position at UTSA. Starner spent five seasons coaching the Roadrunners, Starner resigned in 1995 with an 84–58 record at the school. His teams won conference regular season championships in 1991 and 1992.

Head coaching record

References

External links
Coaching record @ sports-reference.com

1943 births
Living people
American men's basketball coaches
American men's basketball players
Basketball coaches from Minnesota
Basketball players from Minnesota
College men's basketball head coaches in the United States
High school basketball coaches in Minnesota
Minnesota Golden Gophers men's basketball coaches
Minnesota Morris Cougars football players
Minnesota Morris Cougars men's basketball players
Montana State Bobcats men's basketball coaches
People from Grant County, Minnesota
UTSA Roadrunners men's basketball coaches